The 2007 Cupa României Final was the 69th final of Romania's most prestigious cup competition. The final was played at the Stadionul Dan Păltinişanu in Timișoara on 26 May 2007 and was contested between Liga I sides FCU Politehnica Timișoara and Rapid București. The cup was won by Rapid after goals from Buga and Zicu with the latter winning the Man Of The Match Award.

Route to the final

Match details

References

External links
 Official site 

Cupa Romaniei Final, 2007
2006-07
Cup Romaniei Final, 2007
2007